The 2012 Montana gubernatorial election took place on November 6, 2012, to elect the Governor of Montana. Incumbent Democratic Governor Brian Schweitzer was term-limited and could not run for re-election to a third term.

Montana Attorney General Steve Bullock won the Democratic primary with 87% of the vote and former U.S. Representative Rick Hill won the Republican primary with 34% of the vote. In the general election, Bullock won by 7,571 votes, taking 48.9% of the vote to Hill's 47.3%. With a margin of 1.6%, this election was the second-closest race of the 2012 gubernatorial election cycle, behind only the election in Puerto Rico. Due to the close margin, media outlets did not call the race for Bullock until the next day.

Democratic primary

Candidates

Declared
 Steve Bullock, Montana Attorney General
Running mate: John Walsh, Brigadier general and former adjutant general in the Montana National Guard
 Heather Margolis, Montana representative for community service organization ServeNext
Running mate: Steve Nelsen, founder of the Montana Conservation Corps

Withdrew
 Larry Jent, state senator

Declined
 John Bohlinger, Lieutenant Governor of Montana
 Carl Borgquist, president of Grasslands Renewable Energy of Bozeman
 Dave Wanzenried, state senator
 Pat Williams, former U.S. Representative

Polling

Results

Republican primary

Candidates

Declared
 Bob Fanning, retired businessman
Running mate: Joel Boniek, former state representative
Former running mate: Chuck Baldwin, pastor and Constitution Party nominee for president in 2008 (dropped out February 2012)
 Rick Hill, former U.S. Representative
Running mate: Jon Sonju, state senator
 Neil Livingstone, terrorism and national security analyst
Running mate: Ryan Zinke, state senator
 Jim Lynch, former Montana Department of Transportation director
Running mate: Al Olszewski, orthopedic surgeon and Carroll College Trustee
 Ken Miller, former state senator and former chairman of the Montana Republican Party
Running mate: Bill Gallagher, Public Service Commissioner
 Jim O'Hara, Chouteau County Commissioner
Running mate: Scott Swingley, private investigator and former trooper in the Montana Highway Patrol
 Corey Stapleton, former state senator
Running mate: Bob Keenan, former President of the Montana Senate

Withdrew
 Jeff Essmann, Majority Leader of the Montana Senate
 Drew Turiano, real estate investor

Declined
 Denny Rehberg, U.S. Representative (ran for the U.S. Senate)

Polling

Results

General election

Candidates
 Steve Bullock (D), Montana Attorney General
Running mate: John Walsh, Brigadier general and former adjutant general in the Montana National Guard
 Rick Hill (R), former U.S. Representative
Running mate: Jon Sonju, state senator
 Ron Vandevender (Libertarian), businessman
Running mate: Marc Mulcahy

Debate
Complete video of debate, C-SPAN, October 10, 2012

Predictions

Polling
Aggregate polls

With Bohlinger

With Bullock

With Jent

With Wanzenried

Results

Notes

References

External links
 Elections and Government – Montana Secretary of State

Official campaign websites (Archived)
 Steve Bullock for Governor
 Rick Hill for Governor
 Ron Vandevender for Governor

Montana
Governor
2012
Steve Bullock (American politician)